I Remember Miles is a 1998 studio album by Shirley Horn, recorded in tribute to Miles Davis. The album cover illustration was a drawing Davis had once done of them both.

Horn's performance on this album won her the Grammy Award for Best Jazz Vocal Performance at the 41st Grammy Awards.

Reception

The AllMusic review by Richard S. Ginell stated: "Horn's understated, laconic, deceptively casual ballad manner is a natural fit for the brooding Miles persona, and she doesn't have to change a thing in this relaxed, wistfully sung, solidly played collection...In a sad way, the very idea of a Miles tribute is an oxymoronic denial of the ever-restless spirit of this genius who didn't believe in looking backwards. But Shirley Horn certainly serves the man's sensitive side well".

Track listing
 "My Funny Valentine" (Lorenz Hart, Richard Rodgers) – 5:33
 "I Fall in Love Too Easily" (Sammy Cahn, Jule Styne) – 5:39
 "Summertime" (George Gershwin, Ira Gershwin, DuBose Heyward) – 4:59
 "Baby Won't You Please Come Home" (Charles Warfield, Clarence Williams) – 7:21
 "This Hotel" (Johnny Keating, Richard Quine) – 3:37
 "I Got Plenty o' Nuttin'" (Gershwin, Gershwin, Heyward) – 3:39
 "Basin Street Blues" (Williams) – 5:28
 "My Man's Gone Now" (Gershwin, Gershwin, Heyward) – 10:39
 "Blue in Green" (Miles Davis, Bill Evans, Al Jarreau) – 5:59

Personnel
Performers
Shirley Horn - piano, vocals, producer
Ron Carter - bass guitar
Roy Hargrove - flugelhorn, trumpet
Toots Thielemans - harmonica
Buck Hill - tenor saxophone
Charles Ables – double bass
Steve Williams - drums, percussion
Al Foster
Production
Chika Azuma – artwork, design
Sheila Mathis – assistant producer
Dave Baker – engineer, mixing
Ira Gitler – liner notes
Duncan Stanbury – mastering
Richard Seidel – producer
Camille Tominaro – production coordination

References

1998 albums
Shirley Horn albums
Miles Davis tribute albums
Verve Records albums
Grammy Award for Best Jazz Vocal Album